Veenker Memorial Golf Course is a public golf course which is owned and operated by Iowa State University. The golf course was completed in 1938 and it has hosted the Iowa Master's golf tournament since then. In 1959 the course was renamed for George F. Veenker, who was the head football coach at Iowa State from 1931 to 1936. In 2003 Veenker was ranked among "America's Best State Public Access Courses" by Golfweek magazine.

References

College golf clubs and courses in the United States
Golf clubs and courses in Iowa
Iowa State Cyclones facilities
Iowa State University
Tourist attractions in Story County, Iowa
1938 establishments in Iowa
Sports venues completed in 1938